Amri is an Arabic ethnic group of Sudan. The members of this group speak Sudanese Arabic.  The number of people in this group is about 50,000.

External links 
Amri Joshua Project

Arabs in Sudan
Ethnic groups in Sudan